This is a list of flag bearers who have represented East Timor (or Timor-Leste) at the Olympics.

Flag bearers carry the national flag of their country at the opening ceremony of the Olympic Games.

See also
Timor-Leste at the Olympics

References

East Timor at the Olympics
Timor-Leste
Olympic flagbearers
Olympics